The Haitian Heritage Museum Miami is located in Miami, Florida and exhibits  art, culture and heritage from Haiti. It was founded in 2004 by Eveline Pierre and Serge Rodriguez. commemorating Haiti's Bicentennial.

References

Website
Haitian Heritage Museum

Ethnic museums in Florida
Haitian-American culture in Miami
Museums in Miami
Museums established in 2004
2004 establishments in Florida